Brother 2 is a 2000 Russian crime film. It is the sequel to the 1997 film Brother. Much of it is set in Chicago.

Plot

The film opens with Danila Bagrov being interviewed on television with two friends from the army. It is made apparent, that unlike the prequel's subplot, where Danila was depicted as an HQ clerk, he is, in fact, a combat veteran from the First Chechen war (which explains his non-amateur performance and skill in the first film). All three now live in Moscow, where Ilya Setevoy (Kirill Pirogov) is a professional programmer who works for the State Historical Museum on Red Square whilst Konstantin (Kostya) Gromov works in the security department for the Nikolayevsky Bank. Danila himself reveals his ambition to study medicine.

After the interview, the friends retire to a bathhouse where Kostya reveals that his twin brother, Dmitry Gromov, is an ice hockey player for the Chicago Blackhawks and is being blackmailed by American kingpin Richard Mennis. According to Konstantin, Dmitry once played for his home club, the Kiev Falcons, when he was invited by the NHL and emigrated to the United States. After he moved, the Ukrainian mafia moved in on him, demanding protection money. Dmitry was desperate and appealed to Mennis, who took him under contract. Due to Dmitry's lack of English, he did not understand the terms, which effectively left Dmitry as an indentured servant with most of the money going to Mennis. Konstantin informs that Mennis has come to Moscow to meet his employer, Valentin Belkin, to discuss an international business proposal.

In a different part of Russia, that same television programme was watched by Danila's brother Viktor Bagrov and their mother. Seeing how her older son has turned into a drinking policeman, whilst her younger is now on TV, she pleads that Viktor travels to Moscow and seek his brother there. The irony of the scene is that in the first film it was exactly the opposite, where Viktor was the role model. After the bathhouse, Danila meets up and begins an affair with a Russian pop singer Irina Saltykova, who he met at the TV station.

The next morning, Kostya approaches Belkin and pleads to remind Mennis about his brother. Belkin agrees, but Dmitry Gromov is of little concern to both of them. Belkin, being a Russian kingpin himself, wishes to cooperate with Mennis to legalise their assets. The importance of the new venture with Mennis makes Belkin see Kostya as a threat and that evening, Danila stops at Kostya's apartment to discover him shot dead.

Danila and Ilya begin planning their revenge. On the black market, they purchase a CD with personal information about Belkin, whilst a visit to a neo-nazi friend of Ilya's gets them armed with trophy guns and grenades from the Second World War. Meanwhile, Viktor has arrived in Moscow and manages to find Danila in the museum, where he agrees to join their plans, and helps them steal a car.

Danila and Viktor make first contact with Belkin at an elite gymnasium where Belkin's son Fedya is studying. Danila introduces himself as Fedya's new teacher and invites Belkin to the staffroom for a private conversation. At gunpoint he questions him about Kostya's murder. Belkin reveals that it was done under the pressure of Mennis and discloses much of his illegal operations including smuggling of pornography and extortion. Afterwards, he pleads for mercy, which Danila grants, saying "it would be a shame to leave such a kid with no father". Earlier, Danila watched Fedya read a very patriotic poem to the audience which moved him, and he will continue to mouth it throughout the film.

The trio clear the museum, and Danila gives Ilya his remaining money to procure passports and tickets to Chicago. It is revealed that Kostya's murder was due to a misunderstanding, as he only wanted him fired. However, the stunt in the school now threatens his whole operation with Mennis. Belkin's thugs and his police contacts begin to search the city. Danila decides to lay low at Saltykova's apartment in the elite Kotelnicheskaya embankment building and brings Viktor with him. Meanwhile, Belkin's thugs discover the stolen car in the building's parking lot. Saltykova's chauffeur Boris warns Danila, and the Bagrov brothers ambush the mobsters and then lead them on a chase through the town and into a closed alley, where they make quick work of the thugs with the Maxim gun they took from the museum. News of Bagrov's success concern Belkin's partners, who begin doubting the security of their operation. Learning of the bought tickets under Bagrov's name, Belkin alerts the Ukrainian mafia in Chicago.

To avoid capture, the brothers fly to America separately, and Viktor arrives in Chicago without any suspicion. Danila instead takes a flight to New York City where he arrives in Brighton Beach. There, he buys a cheap car to travel to Chicago by road, but it breaks down just outside Pennsylvania. Stranded, he hitches a ride to Chicago with trucker Ben Johnson. Despite Danila's limited English, the two become close friends and Ben shows Danila much about American life. Upon their arrival in Chicago, Ben drives by prostitutes, one of whom, Marylin, turns out to be a Russian named Dasha.

Back in Moscow, Belkin is still determined to catch Danila, but a background check revealed that Viktor was on board the flight to Chicago. Moreover a background check reveals his identity as "the Tatar" hitman from the first film. Paranoid, Belkin alerts the Ukrainian mafia in Chicago to find him. Meanwhile, Viktor arrives to the Ukrainian district in Chicago and quickly begins to spend his money, enjoying the American lifestyle, making tours of the city dressed as Al Capone. Danila attempts to meet up with Dmitry and Viktor, but is unable to make contact with both. Badly needing a translator, he decides to find Dasha and travels to the neighbourhood where she works. Just before he can run away with her, he is savagely beaten by Dasha's pimp's henchmen. The Police let him go on the basis of recognizance and he gets revenge by tricking the same group into selling him weapons, which he steals by subterfuge. Afterwards, Dasha's pimp attempts to get even with her but is in turn killed by Danila, leaving Dasha no choice but to go with him.

Danila and Dasha finally meet up with Viktor and the three enjoy an evening campfire on the beach of Lake Michigan where they share their experiences and attitude towards American society. Dasha tells her story of how she came in the early 1990s as an exchange student, worked in escort service in New York before finally degrading into a street hooker. Viktor, on the other hand, is much too impressed with the power of money that drives America. Danila, however, shows his patriotism and offers Dasha to come back home with them, replying to her "what will I do there?" with the "What have you achieved here?" inferring to her social status. As for Viktor, Danila reminds him there are things that money can't buy. This philosophical discussion is broken by a homeless black man, who stumbles across them and is insulted when Danila called him a negr (not knowing that the word is an insult in English; in Russia, the word "Negr" ("Негр") means only "a person with black skin"). While waiting for a fight to come, Dasha replies that she believes that the aggressive primal nature of black people drives fear into white people, thus making them ultimately superior. This theory fails its test, when Danila's warning shots into the sand quickly forces the attackers to flee.

Regardless, Danila finally begins to move in against Mennis and first hits his front, the Club Metro. Expecting Mennis to be there he sneaks a weapon into the toilet, and during a Rock concert that evening, involving the Bi-2 band, kills every member of Mennis' mafia he encounters in the basement. Mennis, alas, is absent. Viktor, himself picked up a tail by the Ukrainian mafia, draws them away and kills their hitman, but not before learning of the mafia's operations and headquarters. The next morning Danila climbs 50 or so floors on a skyscraper's fire escape to reach Mennis' office. He finds him in a game of chess. Killing his colleague, he finally confronts him alone. As if continuing the debate on the lakeside, in his monologue (in Russian) he asks the American if power really comes from money. Arguing that his brother (whose photo is lying next to the chess table) believes this theory, Danila instead thinks that power lies in the Truth. He (implying Mennis), can be rich, but not strong, as his money he stole from someone else. Thus the tricked person is right, so he is stronger. Almost weeping in fear, Mennis agrees. In conclusion, Danila demands all of the money taken from Dmitry to be returned.

Giving Dmitry his money, Danila sets off back home to Moscow driving through the Ukrainian neighbourhood he witnesses a police siege around the former headquarters of the Ukrainian mafia, where Viktor killed everyone inside. As he is dragged out handcuffed, Viktor shouts his intentions to stay in America. The film ends with Danila and Dasha taking off to Moscow, and the final call to Irina is not intercepted, as presumably, Belkin is also removed by his "investors", who in an earlier scene, face to face told him, that the sum of money he set up in this operation is too much to be risked. At the airport, Dasha is told that she will never be able to enter the United States again due to the expiry of her visa, but she does not care, signalling an intention she will never come back by giving the gate agent the finger.

Impact of the film

Similarly to the first film, Brother 2 was a success upon release. The film picked up on the changing attitudes of the Russian public in the late 1990s. It also shows the erosion of a common naive stereotype of the 'perfect' West, and in particular, America. The film depicts the immense divide between the black and white communities with the former ghettoised. Also, it shows that, like in Russia, high-profile businessmen can have very lucrative activities. One of the most powerful messages was the final confrontation when Danila asks Mennis if money really gives one strength and power, and instead argues that strength and power can only be found in the Truth. This quote "Strength is in truth" would become a catchphrase among the Russian public.

At the same time, the film highlights positive elements about the United States, but from a different perspective in the American people who, like in Russia, come in all colours and social statuses. Examples are the black television presenter Lisa Jeffrey who has a short affair with Danila and the trucker Ben, who at the very end of the film, only accepts an audio cassette with Russian music, which the two listened to whilst driving across the very picturesque landscape. Finally, on a humorous note, the film carried across the message that hardships and people's discomfort with life exist everywhere as shown by the two complaining taxi drivers both in Moscow and in New York.

Balabanov's epic picture mirrored the Russian awakening and growing sense of patriotism. Danila's character is once again the macroscopic personification of this trend. On the surface he is somewhat innocent, simple, laid back and confident (enough to land him in bed with a Russian celebrity and an American News reporter), underneath, however, is a solid righteous person, who is not afraid of putting two prison cellmates in their place, taking on a Russian kingpin banker and evading his security, shaking up Chicago's Black neighbourhood to 'rescue' a fellow Russian (despite being initially beaten), and ultimately bringing down a whole American crime organisation. All to avenge his friend and help his brother, with little material gain for himself. Despite this, he shows compassion to his adversaries, like sparing Belkin because of his son. The theme, that family members can be very different, is very much exploited in Viktor's character, who despite aiding them in Moscow, somewhat lets him down in Chicago. Dasha's character very much reflects the failure of many post-Soviet Russian Immigrants, whose 'American Dream' turned into a nightmare, again showing the Russian audience that emigration can, quite literally, force a talented person to literally walk the streets. Both Irina and Ilya illustrate that opportunities in Russia exist as well and success comes to those that strive for it. Belkin, unlike Krugly in the first film, is not wholly depicted as evil, but instead shows how money can corrupt a person into becoming evil. The subplot that Konstantin's murder was unintended, and moreover, he got his job in the bank because of Belkin's past friendship with Kostya's father drives that message. This again reflects the Russian reality how many people who rose in the 1990s had to turn on their friends and family. The poem that his son read in the school, Danila would recite throughout the film. Finally, Mennis is shown for what he is, being an influential businessman, up front, he is a nothing but a coward.

The film was criticised for being too Russo-centric and in extreme cases the elements of racism and nationalism. For example, the semi-criminal portrayal of the African American community, the deceiving Russian-American Jew (who sells a bad car) and the Ukrainian mafia. The latter in particular often refers to the toilet scene when Viktor finishes off in cold blood remarking: "You bitches will answer to me for Sevastopol!" referring to the sensitive topic on the ownership of that city. Ukrainians are also called banderovets by Viktor (e.g. when he arrives at the airport), what does not appear in English subtitles. Albeit, the listed scenes have clear humorous overtones. In 2015 the film was officially banned in Ukraine for "containing scenes that humiliate Ukrainians as a nation".

In October 2009, the film received mention in a Salon article.+

Literature
Florian Weinhold (2013), Path of Blood: The Post-Soviet Gangster, His Mistress and Their Others in Aleksei Balabanov's Genre Films, Reaverlands Books: North Charleston, SC: pp. 66–90.
Susan Larsen (2003), "National Identity, Cultural Authority, and the Post-Soviet Blockbuster: Nikita Mikhalkov and Aleksei Balabanov." Slavic Review, vol. 62, No. 3, pp. 491–511.

Cast

Soundtrack
The film's soundtrack consists of popular songs from contemporary Russian and Ukrainian rock artists, such as Splean, Bi-2, Zemfira, Smyslovye Gallyutsinatsii, Chicherina, Okean Elzy and Nautilus Pompilius. The pop-star Irina Saltykova being one of the important characters, there are some of her songs in the soundtrack. The latter is partly a reference to the soundtrack of the original Brother, which consists entirely of Nautilus Pompilius' songs. The soundtrack includes "Lafayette" performed by American band Sleeping For Sunrise.

 "Бай-Бай" (Bye-Bye) — Irina Saltykova (O. Molchanov, A. Slavorosov)
 "Полковник" (Colonel) — Bi-2 (Shura Bi-2, Lyova Bi-2)
 "Счастье" (Happiness) — Bi-2 (Shura Bi-2, Lyova Bi-2)
 "Солнечный круг" (Sun Ring) — Irina Saltykova (O. Molchanov, A. Slavorosov)
 "Варвара" (Varvara) — Bi-2 (Shura Bi-2, Lyova Bi-2)
 "Огоньки" (Twinkles) — Irina Saltykova (P. Andreev)
 "Искала" (I Was Searching) — Zemfira (Zemfira Ramazanova)
 "Ту Лу Ла" (Tu Lu La) — Chicherina (Yulia Chicherina)
 "Гибралтар" (Gibraltar) — Vyacheslav Butusov (Vyacheslav Butusov, Dmitry Gunitsky)
 "Дорога" (The Road) — AuktsYon (Leonid Fyodorov, Dmitry Ozeretsky)
 "Кавачай" (Kavachay) — Okean Elzy (Svyatoslav Vakarchuk, Pavlo Hudimov)
 "Вечно молодой" (Forever Young) — Smyslovyie gallyutsinatsii (Sergey Bobunets, Oleg Genenfeld)
 "Коли тебе нема" (When You Are Out) — Okean Elzy (Svyatoslav Vakarchuk)
 "Розовые очки" (Pink Glasses) — Smyslovye gallyutsinatsii (Sergey Bobunets, Oleg Genenfeld)
 "Линия жизни" (Life Line) — Splean (Aleksandr Vasilyev)
 "Секрет" (The Secret) — Agata Kristi (Gleb Samoylov)
 "Никогда" (Never) — Vadim Samoylov (Vadim Samoylov)
 "Город" (The City) — Tantsy minus (Vyacheslav Petkun)
 "Катманду" (Kathmandu) — Krematoriy (Armen Grigoryan)
 "Иду" (I Am Going) — Tantsy minus (Vyacheslav Petkun)
 "Земля" (Earth) — Masha i medvedi (Denis Petukhov, Maria Makarova)
 "Lafayette" — Sleeping for Sunrise (Blake J. Zweig, James Konczyk, Jay Ranz)
 "Погляд" (The Sight) — La-Mansh (Dmytro Tsyperdiuk)
 "Прощальное письмо" (Farewell Letter) — Nautilus Pompilius and Children's Choir led by M. I. Slavkin (Vyacheslav Butusov, Dmitry Umetsky)
 "Стюардесса Жанна" (Jeanne The Stewardess) — The Metropol Restaurant Orchestra (Vladimir Presnyakov Jr., Ilya Reznik, Aleksandr Starobinets)

Critical response

'When sequels start appearing, that's a healthy sign ... Two major risks have left Brother. Natural environment has gone - the alleys of Saint Petersburg, the bazaar on the Sennaya Square - a spot-on depiction of the new times. Only the story was left - honest, straightforward and not new, just like our hero. «Immorality» that served as the main attraction in Brother, paradoxically combining the frankness of Komsomol with zombie-like killings, is also gone. What's left is spirituality: the Orthodox values, «The power is not in the money, but in the truth», violence - not because it's as easy as brushing teeth, but because there's injustice in the world - and thus one must fight ... A strong movie, not boring to watch. Aleksei Balabanov makes films the only way possible: like we are living in a healthy country that produces 150 movies yearly. And while it's not true, and there's a clean field around him, and he is taken almost for a savior who carries his cross alone, we should react to this film adequately: calmly, without hysterics, just like a normal cinema requires.'

'Our answer to James Bond and other "anti-Soviet Cinema",’ “Brother 2” was ‘ideological...playing ‘to the fears of its national audience...the first manifestation of Russia’s new snobbery towards the US,’ the Itogi weekly’s reviewer wrote. Its central character was ‘a) cute and b) clever ... war creates a special kind of childish killers ... The search for national identity ... only leads to unwarranted xenophobia.'

Censorship 
The Ukrainian State Film Agency in 2015 banned the film to be shown on the territory of the country because, according to experts of the department, it contains scenes “that are humiliating for Ukrainians on a national basis, and also because of the incorrectness of the demonstration of this film during the aggression in the east of the country.”

Possible sequel 
After the release of the second part, Balabanov said that the story of Danila Bagrov was finished, that Sergei Bodrov didn't want to reprise the role anymore and that he wanted to move in a new direction. Yet later on he hinted at a possible third part while answering a comment on the official Brother website which suggested to "send Danila to the Second Chechen War and kill him". Apparently in 2002 he released War where Bodrov played a supporting role of Captain Medvedev.

Sergei Bodrov subsequently took up directing himself, but didn't plan a sequel. However, he did not completely rule out this possibility. In 2001 he directed a criminal drama entitled Sisters which was compared by critics to Balabanov's dilogy. Bodrov himself appeared in an episodic role of a nameless New Russian — according to Bodrov himself, a cameo of his Bagrov character.

In 2014, Viktor Sukhorukov declared his desire to make Brother 3 in memory of Balabanov and Bodrov. He said that he had long planned the sequel and was full of ideas for the new story which had been rejected by Balabanov during his lifetime, including the release of Viktor from the American prison and return to St. Petersburg in an oil trawler.

On February 28, 2019 it was reported that a Russian musician and showman Stanislav Baretsky was planning to shoot Brother 3 with a completely new crew and cast, including ex-prisoners. This caused a negative reaction from fans, Bodrov's relatives, Viktor Sukhorukov, Irina Saltykova and CTB producer Sergei Selyanov who stated that his company would never give film rights to Baretsky and that they might sue the showman at one point.

References

External links

2000 films
Russian crime drama films
2000s crime action films
2000 crime drama films
2000s Russian-language films
Ukrainian-language films
Films about organized crime in the United States
Films about the Russian Mafia
Films directed by Aleksei Balabanov
Films set in 1999
Films set in Brooklyn
Films set in Chicago
Films set in Moscow
Films set in the United States
Films shot in Chicago
Films shot in Moscow
Films shot in New York City
Films shot in Pittsburgh
Russian sequel films
2000s English-language films
Foreign films set in the United States